Sand boils or sand volcanoes occur when water under pressure wells up through a bed of sand. The water looks like it is boiling up from the bed of sand, hence the name.

Sand volcano

A sand volcano or sand blow is a cone of sand formed by the ejection of sand onto a surface from a central point. The sand builds up as a cone with slopes at the sand's angle of repose. A crater is commonly seen at the summit. The cone looks like a small volcanic cone and can range in size from millimetres to metres in diameter.

The process is often associated with soil liquefaction and the ejection of fluidized sand that can occur in water-saturated sediments during an earthquake. The New Madrid Seismic Zone exhibited many such features during the 1811–12 New Madrid earthquakes. Adjacent sand blows aligned in a row along a linear fracture within fine-grained surface sediments are just as common, and can still be seen in the New Madrid area.

In the past few years, much effort has gone into the mapping of liquefaction features to study ancient earthquakes.  The basic idea is to map zones that are susceptible to the process and then go in for a closer look.  The presence or absence of soil liquefaction features is strong evidence of past earthquake activity, or lack thereof.

These are to be contrasted with mud volcanoes, which occur in areas of geyser or subsurface gas venting.

Flood protection structures
Sand boils can be a mechanism contributing to liquefaction and levee failure during floods. This effect is caused by a difference in pressure on two sides of a levee or dike, most likely during a flood. This process can result in internal erosion, whereby the removal of soil particles results in a pipe through the embankment. The creation of the pipe will quickly pick up pace and will eventually result in failure of the embankment.

A sand boil is difficult to stop. The most effective method is by creating a body of water above the boil to create enough pressure to slow the flow of water. A slower flow will not be able to move soil particles. The body of water is often created with sandbags forming a ring around the boil.

During the flood of spring 2011, the United States Army Corps of Engineers had to work to contain the largest sand boil ever discovered. The sand boil measured 30 feet by 40 feet and was located in the city of Cairo, Illinois at the confluence of the Mississippi River and the Ohio River.

Earthquakes
An example of this is during the 1989 earthquake in San Francisco, when sand boils brought up debris from the 1906 earthquake. This process is a result of liquefaction. By mapping the location of sand boils that erupted in the Marina District during the 1989 Loma Prieta earthquake, scientists discovered the site of a lagoon that existed in 1906. The lagoon developed after the Fair's Seawall was constructed, and was later filled in in 1915 in preparation for the Panama–Pacific International Exposition.

See also 
Internal erosion
Seepage

References 

Sand
Sedimentology
Seismology